Coney Island is a 1943 American Technicolor musical film released by Twentieth Century Fox and starring Betty Grable in one of her biggest hits. A "gay nineties" musical (set in that time period), it also featured George Montgomery, Cesar Romero, and Phil Silvers, was choreographed by Hermes Pan, and was directed by Walter Lang. Betty Grable also starred in the 1950 remake, Wabash Avenue.

In 1944, the year after the film was released, it was nominated for an Oscar for Alfred Newman in the category of Best Music, Scoring of a Musical Picture

The film is also known as: Coney Island in Sweden, L'île aux plaisirs in France, L'isola delle sirene in Italy, San oneiro in Greece, Se necesitan maridos in Spain and Tivolin kaunotar in Finland.

Plot

Cast
 Betty Grable as Kate Farley
 George Montgomery as Eddie Johnson
 Cesar Romero as Joe Rocco
 Charles Winninger as Finnegan
 Phil Silvers as Frankie
 Matt Briggs as William Hammerstein
 Paul Hurst as Louie
 Frank Orth as the Bartender

Soundtrack
"Take It from There"
Music by Ralph Rainger
Lyrics by Leo Robin
"Beautiful Coney Island"
Music by Ralph Rainger
Lyrics by Leo Robin
"Miss Lulu from Louisville"
Music by Ralph Rainger
Lyrics by Leo Robin
"Get the Money"
Music by Ralph Rainger
Lyrics by Leo Robin
"There's Danger in a Dance"
Music by Ralph Rainger
Lyrics by Leo Robin
"Old Demon Rum"
Music by Ralph Rainger
Lyrics by Leo Robin
"Put Your Arms Around Me, Honey (I Never Knew Any Girl Like You)"
Music by Albert von Tilzer
Lyrics by Junie McCree
"Cuddle Up a Little Closer"
Words by Otto A. Harbach (as O.A. Hauerbach)
Music by Karl Hoschna (as Karl L. Hoschna)
"When Irish Eyes Are Smiling"
Music by Ernest Ball
Lyrics by Chauncey Olcott and George Graff Jr.
"Pretty Baby"
Music by Egbert Van Alstyne and Tony Jackson
Lyrics by Gus Kahn
"The Darktown Strutters' Ball"
Written by Shelton Brooks

Radio adaptations
Coney Island was twice presented as a one-hour adaptation on Lux Radio Theatre. On April 17, 1944 Dorothy Lamour and Alan Ladd played the leads. Then on September 30, 1946 Grable reprised her screen role, joined by Victor Mature and Barry Sullivan.

References

External links
 
 
 
 
 
 
 New York Times review on June 17, 1943

1943 films
20th Century Fox films
1943 musical films
Films directed by Walter Lang
Films scored by Alfred Newman
Films set in amusement parks
Films set in Coney Island
Films set in Brooklyn
American musical films
Films produced by William Perlberg
1940s English-language films
1940s American films